Sonia Orin Lyris is the author of several novels and various science fiction and fantasy stories and articles in computing and literary journals.  She is the author of The Seer. and the sequel novels forming "The Stranger Trilogy". She has published fiction for Wizards of the Coast, Asimov's Science Fiction Magazine, and Pulphouse.

In 1996, she co-founded eMarket Group, Ltd., an online merchandise company, and worked with them as Executive Vice President.  She also helped to build systems for e-commerce sites like Viz Media.

Lyris has been a contributing editor to the C-spot and associate editor at the Journal Of Universal Rejection (JofUR). In 2012, she was interviewed in an episode of The Tomorrow Project podcast, where she discussed the relationship between real-world science and science fiction.

Lyris lives in Seattle, Washington.

Bibliography

Novels and series

The Seer Saga
 A short prequel to The Seer, previously published as part of 

The Stranger Trilogy is the sequel to The Seer.

Magic: The Gathering

 And Peace Shall Sleep has translations in German, French, and Polish.

Shorter fiction

Republished: 

 Republished separately in 2012:

Collections
 This anthology contains the stories Descent, The Green, and Motherhood.

Nonfiction

See also

References

External links

20th-century American novelists
20th-century American short story writers
20th-century American women writers
21st-century American novelists
21st-century American short story writers
21st-century American women writers
American science fiction writers
American women novelists
American women short story writers
Living people
Women science fiction and fantasy writers
Year of birth missing (living people)